Kim Jung-hwan (born September 2, 1983) is a South Korean right-handed sabre fencer. 

Kim is a seven-time team Asian champion, two-time individual Asian champion, two-time team world champion, and 2018 individual world champion.

A three-time Olympian, Kim is a two-time individual Olympic bronze medalist, and two-time team Olympic champion. 

Kim is the first Asian fencer to win four Olympic medals; the first South Korean fencer to medal at three consecutive Olympic Games; and the first South Korean fencer across all disciplines to win a medal in both the individual and team events in a single Olympic Games.

Early life
Kim played baseball throughout elementary school and had aspired to become a baseball player, having been a fan of KBO League team LG Twins since childhood. In 1996, he was introduced to fencing by a friend and took up the sport after his middle school physical education teacher advised him that his long arms would be more suitable for fencing. He was schoolmates with future national teammate Won Woo-young at Hongik University High School, then one of the few schools in Seoul which had a fencing team, and graduated from Korea National Sport University.

Career
Kim was first selected for the senior national team in 2004 and won gold at the Seoul Grand Prix in 2005 despite being a relative newcomer. However, his medal was forfeited and he was suspended for a year after failing a doping test, which he unsuccessfully argued was due to medication he had taken at home to treat his insomnia. After serving out his suspension, he returned and won medals in the Grand Prix circuit and the 2007 Summer Universiade but failed to qualify for the 2008 Summer Olympics. The slump in form coupled by the sudden death of his father, who he was close to, in 2009 nearly led him to quit the sport altogether. He enlisted for mandatory military service in January 2010 and was assigned to the Korea Armed Forces Athletic Corps. He was temporarily released to participate in the 2010 Asian Games, winning silver in the team event. At the 2012 Summer Olympics, he won a gold medal in the men's team sabre event together with Won Woo-young, Oh Eun-seok and Gu Bon-gil. In the individual event he was defeated in the second round. The quartet continued to dominate in the team events, sweeping gold at both the Asian Championships and Asian Games hosted at home and winning silver at the World Championships. 

In the 2014–15 Fencing World Cup, Kim won gold at the New York Grand Prix in individual men's sabre, and finished the season ranked world #2 behind Gu. Kim and his teammates had a disappointing run at the 2015 World Championships, as they were each eliminated in the quarter-finals of the individual event as well as the team event. They bounced back to defend their team gold at the Asian Championships weeks later. In the individual event, Kim defeated Gu in the final and claimed his second individual gold of the Asian Championships.

Kim qualified for the 2016 Summer Olympics, having finished the 2015–16 World Cup season ranked world #1 and won gold medals at the Moscow Grand Prix and in both the team and individual events at the Asian Championships in Wuxi. There was no men's sabre team event at the Olympics as it was not in rotation for that edition. With his bronze medal win, he became the first South Korean male sabre fencer to win an individual medal at the Olympics and dedicated his win to his late father. He was awarded the Order of Sports Merit Cheongnyong (Hangul: 청룡장; English: Blue Dragon) class, the South Korean government's highest honor bestowed on professional athletes who meet the criteria.

In 2018, he and his teammates Gu, Oh Sang-uk and Kim Jun-ho, swept gold in the team sabre event at both the World Championships and the Asian Games. Kim also won gold in the individual event at the World Championships, his first ever World Championships individual gold. The Asian Games was his last major international tournament as he officially announced his retirement from the national team that December. 

Kim remained with the Korea Sports Promotion Foundation as a "player-coach". At Gu's persuasion, he returned to the national team and qualified in time for the Seoul Grand Prix held in April 2019, winning bronze. He joined the same teammates from the 2018 World Championships and Asian Games and they qualified for the 2020 Summer Olympics, which was later postponed for a year due to the COVID-19 pandemic. For a period of time, he had to double as the team's coach due to their coach being dismissed and the federation being unable to find a replacement immediately. Despite the disruption, the quartet successfully defended their gold medal. He was the only member to medal in the individual event as Gu was knocked out in the Round of 32 while Oh failed to advance to the semi-finals in a shock loss to Sandro Bazadze, whom Kim went on to defeat in the bronze medal bout. His two medals at the 2020 Olympics made him the first South Korean fencer (male or female, across all three disciplines) to win a medal at three consecutive Olympic Games.

Following on his success at the Olympics, Kim began the 2021–22 World Cup season with a gold medal at the Orléans Grand Prix in November 2021, his first gold in a Grand Prix since 2017. This was followed by individual bronze medals at two other World Cup events. He won silver in the individual event of the 2022 Asian Championships, losing to Gu for a second time in a row at the championship final. During the 2022 World Championships, his performance was hindered by a back injury and he was eliminated during the Round of 32 in the individual event and missed the final match of the team event. He was also part of the team that won gold at the Asian Championships and two other World Cup events, allowing them to retain their #1 ranking in the team category for the season.

Personal life
Kim married Byun Jung-eun in September 2020. Their son Ro-yi was born in April 2022.

Kim earned a master's degree in sports industry studies at Kookmin University. He is pursuing doctoral studies at Kyonggi University.

Medal Record

Olympic Games

World Championship

Asian Championship

Grand Prix

World Cup

References

External Links 
Profile and Statistics on the International Fencing Federation website

Living people
1983 births
Fencers from Seoul
South Korean male sabre fencers
Korea National Sport University alumni
Kookmin University alumni
Fencers at the 2012 Summer Olympics
Fencers at the 2016 Summer Olympics
Fencers at the 2020 Summer Olympics
Olympic fencers of South Korea
Olympic gold medalists for South Korea
Olympic bronze medalists for South Korea
Olympic medalists in fencing
Medalists at the 2012 Summer Olympics
Medalists at the 2016 Summer Olympics
Medalists at the 2020 Summer Olympics
Fencers at the 2010 Asian Games
Fencers at the 2014 Asian Games
Fencers at the 2018 Asian Games
Asian Games gold medalists for South Korea
Asian Games silver medalists for South Korea
Asian Games medalists in fencing
Medalists at the 2010 Asian Games
Medalists at the 2014 Asian Games
Medalists at the 2018 Asian Games
Universiade medalists in fencing
Universiade silver medalists for South Korea
Universiade bronze medalists for South Korea
South Korean Buddhists
World Fencing Championships medalists